Jim Hughes (born December 11, 1933) is a former Canadian football player who played for the Hamilton Tiger-Cats. He won the Grey Cup with them in 1957. He played college football at San Jose State University and was selected in the 1956 NFL draft by the Cleveland Browns.

References

Hamilton Tiger-Cats players
San Jose State University alumni
1933 births
Living people